The Anchorage Police Department (APD) is the police department of the Municipality of Anchorage in Alaska. Functioning as a service area of the Municipality, its patrol area includes the core "Anchorage bowl", the Seward Highway corridor from Potter Creek south to McHugh Creek, and the Glenn Highway corridor north of the Anchorage bowl to the municipality's border with the Matanuska-Susitna Borough, including the communities of Eagle River, Chugiak and Eklutna. Through a memorandum of understanding, APD also handles calls on Joint Base Elmendorf-Richardson which involve civilian suspects or victims. Serving Alaska's largest city, APD is also the only metropolitan agency and the largest municipal police force in Alaska.

Unlike other Alaska police agencies except the Alaska State Troopers, APD is large enough that it is able to be the only municipal police agency that operates its own internal police academy, which is accredited by the Alaska Police Standards Council (APSC), the Alaska state law enforcement officer credentialing and regulatory agency. Applicants are also accepted as entry-level officers who have graduated from the other two police academies in the state, the paramilitary AK Trooper Academy in Sitka in SE Alaska, which trains the majority of officers in the state and the Tannana Valley Academy, which is affiliated with University of Alaska-Fairbanks (UAF). Out of state police officers are also often accepted as lateral entry candidates based on their backgrounds and training. APD Basic recruit classes are conducted as needed when sufficient vacancies arise. In-service and specialized training is also offered to APD officers and to other agency guest officers.

History
The city of Anchorage had a modest beginning as a tent city on the banks of Ship Creek and was originally called Ship Creek Landing. Law enforcement for the Alaska Territory had been in the hands of the United States Marshals. On November 23, 1920, Anchorage was incorporated as a first class city.

On December 22, 1920, the city council appointed John J. Sturgus to begin as Chief of Police on January 1, 1921, at a salary of $200 a month. He was a one-man police department until his death just six weeks later. He was shot and killed with his own gun on February 20, 1921. Sturgus's murderer was never apprehended. The city council voted to offer a $1,000 reward, the mayor pledged an additional $250, and all other council members and clerk pledged $100 each, bringing the total reward to $1,950. His death was to be APD's first unsolved homicide. Many men served as chief during Anchorage's violent territorial years. In 1926, the council began hiring night watchmen during the long winter months of October through March. On June 19, 1935, the council received a petition signed by seven property owners to provide a 24-hour police force.

The department got along on foot with the occasional use of a citizen's borrowed car and the use of taxis until the city decided to purchase a vehicle. In August 1930, APD got its first police vehicle: a used Ford for $63.75. It wasn't until April 1941 that the council voted to purchase the department's first new police car—a 1941 Dodge 4-door sedan, completely equipped with siren and spotlight, for $1,401.80.

In the late 1930s and early 1940s, the military began building bases and the population of Anchorage began to grow, jumping from 4,229 in 1939 to 30,060 in 1950.

In 1975, the City of Anchorage merged with the Greater Anchorage Area Borough (GAAB) to form the Municipality of Anchorage. Though APD contracted police services to the Borough, "Spenard officers" had to use separate ordinances and accounting systems in their duties.

Today, the Anchorage Police Department is the largest police department in Alaska, serving a population of approximately 275,000 in a service area encompassing ,  most of the populated portions of the municipality's . The main exceptions are the Turnagain Arm communities of (from north to south) Rainbow, Indian, Bird, Girdwood, and portage.

There are several specialized units including Canine, Special Weapons and Tactics (SWAT), Homicide Response Team, Hostage Negotiations Team, Bomb Team, School Resource Officer (SRO), Crisis Intervention Team (CIT), Identification Section, Data System Section, Records Section, Traffic and Crime Prevention Unit. APD's Homicide Response Team has been nationally recognized for their techniques and solvability rate. APD operates high-profile undercover and sting-type counter-vice operations throughout Anchorage to suppress and deter vice, narcotics, prostitution, organized crime and quality of life crimes.
 
The department works closely with Alaska DOT Airport Police at Ted Stevens Anchorage International Airport, the University of Alaska Police, and the Alaska State Troopers, who are headquartered in Anchorage. Due to the unique nature of Alaska, with massive tracts of federal lands and its proximity to foreign nations like Russia which shares a nautical border, APD also works closely with various federal law enforcement agencies, such as the FBI, US Customs and Border Protection and US Secret Service. With a large joint US Army-Air Force Base (Joint Base Elemendorf-Richardson) in its boundaries, APD works closely with the US Army and Air Force military police, Security Police, Defense Dept Police and the criminal investigation agencies, Criminal Investigation Division (CID) of the US Army and Office of Special Investigations (OSI) of the Air Force. The US Coast Guard also patrols waterways in the city limits which are popular with boaters. The US Forest Service law enforcement division also patrols USFS lands that abut Anchorage.

The department's current chief is an alumnus of West Anchorage High School, the University of Alaska and the U.S. Marines. Justin Doll ascended to the office in June 2017. Since his appointment he has opened a new Anchorage Police Department Headquarters Building in downtown Anchorage and secured Federal Grant funding to increase patrol units and secure the main highway corridor between the Matanuska Susitna Valley and Anchorage. The Anchorage Police Department's website claims that "APD has come a long way since those early Territorial years" and then states that, nevertheless, "the men and women of the Anchorage Police Department are proud of their heritage and remain dedicated to protect and serve their community."

Equipment

Officers are issued either the Glock 21 or Glock 22 depending on grip size or officer's preference. APD officers are allowed to qualify and carry personally purchased firearms to include 1911's, Sigs, Springfield XDm and S&W M&P. Officers are issued a Remington 870 shotgun and many officers are also authorized to carry a semi-auto patrol rifle chambered in 5.56mm.

Patrol officers are issued pepper spray, and straight stick baton.  X26 Tasers are carried by some officers on all shifts and the department has made it a priority to acquire and issue tasers to all patrol officers.

Beginning in 2011, the department began a transition to a digital trunked radio system from its old UHF analog system. This new system will allow APD officers to communicate directly with other officers across the state.

Chevrolet Impalas, equipped for police duty, make up a majority of the APD fleet. However, Ford Crown Victorias with police interceptors are still used. SWAT and K9 Officers are issued Ford Expeditions.

See also

 List of law enforcement agencies in Alaska

References

External links
 

1920 establishments in Alaska
Government agencies established in 1920
Municipal police departments of Alaska
Organizations based in Anchorage, Alaska